In enzymology, a sorbose reductase is an enzyme that catalyzes the chemical reaction

D-glucitol + NADP+  L-sorbose + NADPH + H+

Thus, the two substrates of this enzyme are D-glucitol and NADP+, whereas its 3 products are L-sorbose, NADPH, and H+.

This enzyme belongs to the family of oxidoreductases, specifically those acting on the CH-OH group of donor with NAD+ or NADP+ as acceptor. The systematic name of this enzyme class is D-glucitol:NADP+ oxidoreductase. This enzyme is also called Sou1p.

References

 
 
 
 

EC 1.1.1
NADPH-dependent enzymes
Enzymes of unknown structure